Ryalamadugu is a village in Narayanakhed mandal of Sangareddy district in the Indian state of Telangana. And it is a beautiful village And it is famous for its lake beside of fields.

Villages in Medak district